Ludhiana East Tehsil has 181 villages and is in the Ludhiana district, Punjab India.

A

 Assi Kalan

Back to top

B

 Bahadurpur (Ludhiana East)
 Bajra (Ludhiana East)
 Balliawal (Ludhiana East)
 Barwala (Ludhiana East)
 Baura
 Bhagpur (Ludhiana East)
 Bhagwanpura (Ludhiana East)
 Bhaini Ala
 Bhaini Doaba
 Bhaini Gahi
 Bhaini Kima
 Bhaini Nathu
 Bhaini Salu
 Bhairo Munna
 Bhaman Kalan
 Bhaman Khurd
 Bhamian Khurd
 Bhoda
 Bholapur
 Bhukhri Kalan
 Bhukhri Khurd
 Bhupana
 Bhutta (Ludhiana East)
 Bilga (Ludhiana East)
 Bir Sahnewal
 Bool (Ludhiana East)
 Boont (Ludhiana East)
 Boothgarh (Ludhiana East)
 Boothgarh Jattan
 Bounker
 Budhewal
 Burj Mattewara
 Butahri

Back to top

C

 Chak Sarwan Nath
 Chaunta
 Chhandaran
 Chuharwala
 Chupki

Back to top

D

 Dehlon
 Dhanansu
 Dharaur
 Dheri (Ludhiana East)
 Dhoda (Ludhiana East)
 Dholanwal
 Dhoula

Back to top

F

 Fatehgarh Gujjran (Ludhiana East)
 Fatehgarh Jattan

Back to top

G

 Gadapur
 Gaddowal
 Garcha
 Garhi Fazil
 Garhi Sheru
 Gaunsgarh
 Gehlewal
 Ghawaddi
 Ghumait
 Ghumana
 Gobindgarh
 Gopalpur
 Gopalpur
 Gopalpur Bulandewal
 Gujjarwal Bet
 Guram

Back to top

H

 Hadia
 Hadiwal
 Haidar Nagar
 Hawas
 Hayatpura
 Hiran

Back to top

J

 Jagirpur
 Jamalpur Leli
 * Jandiali
 Jarkhar
 Jartauli
 Jassar
 Jassowal
 Jhorran 
 Jhugian Bega
 Jhugian Kadir
 Jiwanpur, Ludhiana
 Jodhewal
 Jagirpur
 Jamalpur Leli
 Jandiali
 Jarkhar
 Jartauli
 Jassar
 Jassowal
 Jhugian Bega
 Jhugian Kadir
 Jonewal

Back to top

L

 Lakhowal
 Laton Dana
 Laton Joga
 Lehr* a

Back to top

M

 Machhian Kalan
 Machhian Khurd
 Mahal Ghumana
 Majara
 Majri
 Mallewal
 Mand Chaunta
 Mangarh
 Mangat
 Mangli Kadar
 Mangli Khas
 Mangli Nichhi
 Mangli Tanda
 Mangli Unchhi
 Marewal
 Mattewara
 Meharban
 Mehlon
 Mehma Singhwala
 Miani
 Mianwal
 Mukandpur
 Mundian Khurd

Back to top

N

 Nangal
 Nat
 Nurwala

Back to top

P

 Paddi
 Paharuwal
 Panglian
 Panjeta
 Partapgarh
 Pawa
 Pirthipur
 Pohir

Back to top

Q

 Qilla Raipur

Back to top

R

 Raian
 Raipur Bet
 Rajur
 Ramgarh
 Rangian
 Rattangarh
 Raur
 Rawat
 Rurka

Back to top

S

 Sahnewal Khurd
 Salempur
 Salkiana
 Sangeh
 Sasrali
 Satiana
 Sattowal
 Saya Kalan
 Saya Khurd
 Shahabana
 Shankar
 Shekhewal
 Sherian
 Silon Kalan
 Silon Khurd
 Sirah
 Sujatwala

Back to top

T

 Tajpur
 Tibba
 Togar

Back to top

U

 Umedpur
 Uppal

Back to top

W

 Walipur

Back to top

References

Villages in Ludhiana district